Peter Alger (born 1952) is a New Zealand potter.

Early life
He was born in New Brunswick, Canada, in 1952 and emigrated to New Zealand with his family in 1959.

Career
In 1968, he became apprenticed to potter Warren Tippet in the Coromandel. He established his own pottery studio in Northland in 1970.

His identifying potter's mark, as registered with the New Zealand Society of Potters, was from 1969 to 1975 the shape of a clover, and from 1975 onwards a stylized fish image.

Recognition
In 1992, he won the Norsewear Art Award with his stoneware work Elemental Bowl and was listed as a Finalist in the New Zealand Society of Potters Easter Show Award Exhibition. In 1992, he was also awarded a Certificate of Merit at the Cleveland Ceramics Awards. In 1993, the Northland Craft Trust and the QEII Arts Council granted him a one-year artist residency at The Quarry in Whangarei. In 1994, he won the Glenfalloch Award at the Cleveland Ceramics Awards.

Collections
Alger's work is held in the collections of the Auckland War Memorial Museum and the Suter Gallery in Nelson.

References

1952 births
Artists from New Brunswick
Canadian emigrants to New Zealand
New Zealand potters
Living people